The 2019 North Texas SC season is the first season for North Texas SC's existence, and their first in USL League One, the third tier of professional soccer in the United States and Canada.

Background 
On November 2, 2018, it was announced by FC Dallas that Dallas would be granted a side to play in the newly created United Soccer League third division for 2019. The club then officially announced the name of the reserve side, North Texas SC, and crest on December 6, 2018.

Club

Roster 
As of March 31, 2019.

Coaching staff

Non-competitive

Preseason friendlies

Midseason friendlies

Competitive

USL League One

Standings

Results

USL League One Playoffs

U.S. Open Cup 

Due to their ownership by a more advanced level professional club (FC Dallas), North Texas SC was one of 13 teams expressly forbidden from entering the Cup competition.

Transfers

FC Dallas loanees

Academy call-ups

Statistics

Goalkeepers

See also 
 2019 FC Dallas season

References

External links 

North Texas SC seasons
North Texas Sc
North Texas Sc
North Texas Sc